Stephen Joel Trachtenberg (born December 14, 1937) was the 15th President of the George Washington University, serving from 1988 to 2007. On August 1, 2007, he retired from the presidency and became GW's President Emeritus and University Professor of Public Service at the Trachtenberg School of Public Policy and Public Administration.

Background
Trachtenberg is a native of Brooklyn, New York who graduated from James Madison High School in 1955.  He graduated from Columbia University in 1959, and earned a J.D. from Yale in 1962 and a Master of Public Administration degree from Harvard's John F. Kennedy School of Government in 1966.

At the beginning of his career, he served as the special assistant to the U.S. Education Commissioner for the Department of Health, Education, and Welfare. He began his career in higher education at Boston University and later became President at the University of Hartford.  From there he went to The George Washington University in Washington, D.C.

He is the author of numerous books including "Presidencies Derailed", The Art of Hiring in America's Colleges & Universities, Thinking Out Loud, Reflections on Higher Education, Speaking His Mind, and Big Man on Campus as well as a foreword to Commercial Providence. He is co-author of "The Art of Hiring in America's Colleges & Universities" and "Letters to the Next President."

He has received 22 honorary degrees in recognition of his contributions to higher education. These include an honorary Doctor of Laws degree from Columbia University in 2007, a Doctor of Public Service degree from The George Washington University in 2008, an honorary Doctor of Public Administration degree from South Korea’s Kyonggi University, an honorary Doctor of Laws degree from Hanyang University in South Korea, and an honorary Doctor of Humanities degree from the University of Hartford in 1989.

George Washington University
Trachtenberg started a full scholarship program for DC public school students, increased the national profile of the university, and has fostered the observance of school traditions such as George Washington's birthday celebration.

During Trachtenberg's tenure as president the university created five new schools: Public Health and Health Services, Public Policy and Public Administration, College of Professional Studies, Graduate School of Political Management, and Media and Public Affairs; initiated the University Honors Program; upgraded GW's library system, which now contains more than two million books and is a member of the prestigious Association of Research Libraries; elevated GW's NCAA Division One athletic program, including record-setting years for men's and women's basketball teams; strengthened university relations with District of Columbia civic leadership; established Northern Virginia and Mount Vernon campuses; upgraded and developed University academic, residential, and recreational facilities; and raised tuition prices.

The university Board of Trustees renamed the public policy school for Trachtenberg, calling it the Trachtenberg School of Public Policy and Public Administration, similar to when the university renamed the Elliott School of International Affairs for Lloyd Elliott, the outgoing president. Trachtenberg holds an endowed chair of public service in the newly named Trachtenberg School. In the Spring of 2007, after announcing his retirement, President Trachtenberg announced himself as that year's commencement keynote speaker, a move met by widespread student outcry and petitioning. Trachtenberg withdrew from the keynote position citing the Virginia Tech massacre without further elaboration.

When President Trachtenberg took office in 1988, tuition at GWU was $9,570, significantly below the national median of $11,330 for all four-year colleges.  When he left office in 2007, tuition was $37,790, among the highest in the nation and significantly above the national median of $30,226. Financial aid kept pace with tuition.

Trachtenberg was recognized throughout his career at GW for his commitment to education. By Resolution of the Mayor and the Council of the District of Columbia, Dec. 4, 2006, was declared "Stephen Joel Trachtenberg Day," recognizing his 19 years of leadership at GW and in the city. Similarly, by Resolution of the Council of the District of Columbia, January 22, 1998, was declared "Stephen Joel Trachtenberg Day" in honor of President Trachtenberg's commitments to minority students, scholarship programs, public school partnerships and community service.

In the Chronicle of Higher Education survey of college presidents' salaries for 2007-08, then-President Stephen Trachtenberg topped the nation with a compensation of $3.7 million.

Rimon Law
Trachtenberg is currently a partner at the international law firm Rimon Law P.C. He joined the firm on December 1, 2014 and is based at the Washington D.C. office. He heads the firm's University Practice group.

Other
U.S. President George W. Bush appointed Trachtenberg to serve in the Honorary Delegation to accompany him to Jerusalem for the celebration of the 60th anniversary of the State of Israel in May 2008.

Trachtenberg is a Fellow of the American Bar Association, the American Academy of the Arts and Sciences, and the National Academy of Public Administration. He also chaired the Rhodes Scholarships Selection Committee for Maryland and the District of Columbia.

Trachtenberg has served as Chairman of the Board of the DC Chamber of Commerce and also served on the transition team for the Mayor of the District of Columbia.

After retiring from George Washington University, Trachtenberg joined the retained executive search firm Korn Ferry as Chairman of the Education Specialty Practice.

An inscription on the reverse side of a bust of George Washington on the North lawn of the House of the Temple (a Masonic temple in Washington, D.C.), cites Trachtenberg as a 33° Freemason of the Scottish Rite. Trachtenberg contributed a foreword to the book by William L. Fox, Lodge of The Double-Headed Eagle: Two Centuries of Scottish Rite Freemasonry In America's Southern Jurisdiction (1997).

Trachtenberg has served on numerous boards and committees, including the Bankiter Foundation, the Ditchley Foundation, the National Board of Trade, the Federal City Council, the Locite Corporation, MNC, Riggs Bank, the CNO Executive Panel, and The White House Fellows Selection Panel. He was awarded the Open Forum Distinguished Public Service Award by the Secretary of State and received the Department of the Treasury Medal of Merit.

References

External links
President Emeritus homepage
GW Hatchet coverage of Trachtenberg's retirement
GW Hatchet article on Trachtenberg keynoting Commencement 2007 at GWU
From Strength to Strength: An Exhibit in Tribute to Stephen Joel Trachtenberg

 
1937 births
Living people
People from Brooklyn
20th-century American Jews
Presidents of George Washington University
Presidents of the University of Hartford
Columbia College (New York) alumni
Yale Law School alumni
Harvard Kennedy School alumni
George Washington University faculty
James Madison High School (Brooklyn) alumni
21st-century American Jews